The 2011-12 LFL Season was the third season of the Lingerie Football League. The league features 12 teams in various cities across the United States and Canada. For the 2011–2012 season the League granted five new franchises: Cleveland Crush, Green Bay Chill, Las Vegas Sin, Minnesota Valkyrie and Toronto Triumph. Dallas Desire has suspended operations for the 2011-2012 season with a planned return in 2012-2013. The stated reasons were financial and issues with the commitment of players on and off the field. The statuses of the Miami Caliente and San Diego Seduction are unknown; they are no longer included on the LFL's list of teams and are not included in the 2011-2012 schedule, but no suspension of operations has been publicly indicated. The Denver Dream and New York Majesty/Euphoria remain shuttered.

After two years as a professional league, the LFL ceased paying players beginning in the 2011 season, converting the league into an amateur league.

In 2011-12, MTV Networks' MTV2 channel once again broadcast 20 regular season games, two conference playoff games, and the championship game during the pre-game of the Super Bowl.  This year however, they presented the games in their entirety at 9:00 PM ET. LFL Presents: LFL, Friday Night Football on MTV2 premiered on August 26, 2011 from Green Bay, Wisconsin.

The 2011 All-Fantasy Game was held in Hamilton, Ontario on July 30, 2011 at Copps Coliseum. Trailing 18-6 in the second half, the Eastern Conference rallied to win 24-18 over the Western Conference. Christy Bell, quarterback for the Philadelphia Passion, was awarded offensive MVP for her 2 touchdown passes, while Liz Gorman, a safety with the Tampa Breeze, was named defensive MVP. The city of Hamilton lost at least $50,000 hosting the game, which drew an estimated crowd of "a few thousand" that only filled approximately half of the lower bowl of the arena, even after ticket prices were slashed to $10 per ticket.

The season kicked off on August 26, 2011 and culminated with Lingerie Bowl IX on February 4, 2012. The LFL Eastern and Western Conference Playoff games were played back-to-back on January 28, 2012 at Citizens Business Bank Arena in Ontario, California. Los Angeles Temptation won its third straight Western Conference Championship while Philadelphia Passion won the Eastern Conference Championship, its second in a row, to set up a rematch of last season's Lingerie Bowl. The 2012 Lingerie Bowl was played during the pre-match of Super Bowl XLVI at Orleans Arena in Paradise, Nevada. Los Angeles Temptation won its third consecutive Lingerie Bowl with a 28 - 6 victory over Philadelphia Passion. The Temptation's Ashley Salerno and Amber Reed were co-MVP's, with Salerno throwing three touchdown passes and Reed scoring two rushing touchdowns.

Expansion and contraction
On November 10, 2010, it was announced that Oklahoma City would be receiving an expansion franchise for the 2011–12 season, only to be publicly rejected by the city's mayor, who said he would not allow the league to operate in the city.

On December 6, 2010, it was announced that Cleveland, Ohio beat out Columbus, Ohio for the newest franchise. In the 2011–12 season, the Cleveland Crush began play at Quicken Loans Arena in downtown Cleveland.

On December 8, 2010, it was announced that a Las Vegas expansion side, to be known as the Las Vegas Sin, would begin play for the 2011–12 season.

On January 25, 2011, the league announced an expansion team  would be awarded to Green Bay, Wisconsin in the fall of 2011. They would be known as the Green Bay Chill and play home games at Resch Center.

On March 17, 2011, the LFL announced that the Dallas Desire would be suspended for the 2011-2012 season with a planned return in 2012-2013. The stated reasons were financial and issues with the commitment of players on and off the field.

On March 23, 2011, the LFL announced a franchise to Minneapolis for the 2011 season. The team would be known as the Minnesota Valkyrie and play at Target Center in downtown Minneapolis (home of the NBA's Minnesota Timberwolves).

On April 12, 2011, the LFL announced that they would have a franchise in Toronto, Ontario. This was the first franchise outside of the United States. Their games would be played in the Ricoh Coliseum where the American Hockey League's Toronto Marlies play.

The status of the San Diego Seduction is unknown; they are no longer included on the LFL's list of teams, but no suspension of operations has been publicly indicated. The Miami Caliente folded.

Teams

Schedule

Playoffs

Standings

Eastern Conference

Western Conference

 - clinched playoff berth   - eliminated from playoffs

Awards
League MVP
 Kyle Dehaven - Baltimore Charm
 Nikki Johnson - Las Vegas Sin
 Amber Reed - Los Angeles Temptation
 Marirose Roach - Philadelphia Passion
 Kam Warner - Seattle Mist

Offensive Player of the Year
 Kyle Dehaven - Baltimore Charm
 Nikki Johnson - Las Vegas Sin
 KK Matheny - Tampa Breeze
 Amber Reed - Los Angeles Temptation
 Marirose Roach - Philadelphia Passion

Defensive Player of the Year
 Jenny Butler - Philadelphia Passion
 Kyle Dehaven - Baltimore Charm
 Liz Gorman - Tampa Breeze
 Sunshine Uli - Las Vegas Sin
 Kam Warner - Seattle Mist

Rookie of the Year
 Annie Erler - Green Bay Chill
 Kyle Dehaven - Baltimore Charm
 Chrisdell Harris - Chicago Bliss
 Nikki Johnson - Las Vegas Sin
 Theresa Petruziello - Cleveland Crush

Coach of the Year
 Chandler Brown - Philadelphia Passion
 Dion Lee - Las Vegas Sin
 Chris Michaelson - Seattle Mist
 Tony Nguyen - Minnesota Valkyrie
 Rick Reeder - Baltimore Charm

Mortaza Award
 Kelly Campbell - Baltimore Charm
 Ogom Chijundu - Los Angeles Temptation
 Jessica Hopkins - Seattle Mist
 Donna Paul - Toronto Triumph
 Marirose Roach - Philadelphia Passion

Most Improved Player
 Kelly Campbell - Baltimore Charm
 Ogom Chijundu - Los Angeles Temptation
 Jessica Hopkins - Seattle Mist
 Adrian Purnell - Tampa Breeze
 Amber Reed - Los Angeles Temptation

Team of the Year
 Baltimore Charm
 Green Bay Chill
 Las Vegas Sin
 Philadelphia Passion
 Seattle Mist

Lingerie Bowl MVP
 Ashley Salerno and Amber Reed - Los Angeles Temptation

8th Man Award (Best Fan Base)
 Seattle Mist

LFL Awards Winners

References

Lingerie Football League
Legends Football League